Pierre Boitard (27 April 1787 Mâcon, Saône-et-Loire – 25 August 1859) was a French botanist and geologist.

As well as describing and classifying the Tasmanian devil, he is notable for his fictional natural history Paris avant les hommes (Paris Before Man), published posthumously in 1861, which described a prehistoric ape-like human ancestor living in the region of Paris. He also wrote Curiosités d'histoire naturelle et astronomie amusante, Réalités fantastiques, Voyages dans les planètes, Manuel du naturaliste préparateur ou l’art d’empailler les animaux et de conserver les végétaux et les minéraux, Manuel d'entomologie etc.

References

External links
 Stephen Trussel, "Paris Before Man"
Gallica Digitised texts
 
Pierre Boitard on The Encyclopedia of Science Fiction

1787 births
1859 deaths
People from Mâcon
19th-century French botanists
French geologists
19th-century French zoologists
Writers of fiction set in prehistoric times